Ceylon Wright (August 16, 1893 – November 7, 1947) was a professional baseball player. He played eight games in Major League Baseball for the Chicago White Sox in 1916, all at shortstop.

References

External links

Major League Baseball shortstops
Chicago White Sox players
Baseball players from Minneapolis
1893 births
1947 deaths
Minor league baseball managers